Elle Armit is an Australian female water polo Olympian. She was born in Townsville, Queensland, Australia in 1991.

Her coach is Maureen O’Toole.

Early life 
Armit was introduced to a modified version of water polo called ‘Flippaball’ when she was ten years’ old. She showed promise and joined Townsville Water Polo club as a junior.

Achievements 
She debuted for the Australian national team, the Aussie Stingers, in 2013.

A highlight was scoring four goals in a 10-7 win against USA in the group stages of the 2017 FINA World League. She also won bronze at the 2019 FINA World Championships and gold at the 2015 World University games.

Armit was a member of the Australian Stingrays squad that competed at the Tokyo 2020 Olympics. The Head Coach was Predrag Mihailović.

By finishing second in their pool, the Aussie Stingers went through to the quarterfinals. They were beaten 8-9 by Russia and therefore did not compete for an Olympic medal. Australia at the 2020 Summer Olympics details the team's performance in depth.

References 

1991 births
Living people
Australian female water polo players
Water polo players at the 2020 Summer Olympics
Olympic water polo players of Australia
20th-century Australian women
21st-century Australian women